Maraand  is a Syrian village located in Bidama Nahiyah in Jisr al-Shughur District, Idlib.  According to the Syria Central Bureau of Statistics (CBS), Maraand had a population of 734 in the 2004 census.

References 

Populated places in Jisr al-Shughur District